Kerema is a village in Hiiumaa Parish, Hiiu County in northwestern Estonia. As of 2021 it had a population of 19, and has an area of 5.56 km2, with a population density of 3.42 people per square kilometre

References
 

Villages in Hiiu County